The Joyce Carol Oates Literary Prize is an annual award presented by the New Literary Project to recognize mid-career writers of fiction. "Mid-career writer" is defined by the project as "an author who has published at least two notable books of fiction, and who has yet to receive capstone recognition such as a Pulitzer or a MacArthur." The prize, which carries a monetary award of $50,000, was established in 2017 and is administered by the New Literary Project, a collaboration of the Lafayette Library and Learning Center Foundation of Lafayette, California and the Department of English of the University of California, Berkeley.

Each year the longlist of finalists for the prize – who are selected by publishers, agents, authors, and author representatives – is announced in the fall of the year before, and the shortlist in early spring of the presenting year.  The winner of the award is then announced in late spring.  The winner gives reading in the San Francisco Bay area and receives a two-week residency in Lafayette and Berkeley.  Shortlisted finalists receive $2,000.

The prize is named after author Joyce Carol Oates, and has been referred to as the Simpson Family Literary Prize and the Joyce Carol Oates Prize. Joyce Carol Oates is an honorary member of the project's board of directors, and has served several times as their artist-in-residence.  The choice of a prize for a mid-career writer was a considered one.  Joseph Di Prisco, the project's founding chairman says "There are too damn many 'emerging writer' prizes — what about emerged writers? ... Ninety-five percent of publishers’ catalogs are made up of writers in the middle of their careers, but unless you're J. K. Rowling or Stephen King, you're not on the best-seller lists. You need support."

The New Literary Project was founded in 2015 by the Lafayette Library, the UC Berkeley English Department, and the Contra Costa County Library.  Its purpose is to foster fiction writing through educational outreach in schools and universities, and to celebrate and support authors.

Recipients

References

External links
 Official website

American literary awards
Fiction awards
Literary awards honoring writers
2017 establishments in the United States